Henry Eccles House is a historic home located at Cool Springs Township, Iredell County, North Carolina.  The house was built about 1861, and is a two-story, three bay by two bay, frame Greek Revival style dwelling.  It has a low hipped roof, one-story rear addition, and two interior brick chimneys. Also on the property is a contributing log barn.

It was added to the National Register of Historic Places in 1980.  The house was formerly known as the "Old Montgomery House".

References

Houses on the National Register of Historic Places in North Carolina
Greek Revival houses in North Carolina
Houses completed in 1861
Houses in Iredell County, North Carolina
National Register of Historic Places in Iredell County, North Carolina
1861 establishments in North Carolina